Matono (Greek: Ματώνω) is the title of the sixth studio album by the popular Greek artist Peggy Zina, released in 2004 by Minos EMI.

Track list

Trivia
In 2005, Christos Dantis released an English language cover single of Matono titled "I'm Bleeding".

Chart performance

2004 albums
Greek-language albums
Peggy Zina albums
Minos EMI albums